Seed & Synthetic Earth is a studio album by American electronic musician Vektroid, released on November 10, 2017. Vektroid stated the album is the second prelude to her upcoming album No Earth, and promoted it through her Twitter page. Before its release, she uploaded the opening track "We Need To Talk" on her YouTube page, and the ending track "Moebius Blue" on her SoundCloud page. The album has a feature from SoundCloud rapper Siddiq.

Track listing

References

2017 albums
Vektroid albums
Electropop albums